Esmailabad Shur Qaleh may refer to:
 Esmailabad Shur Qaleh-ye Bala
 Esmailabad Shur Qaleh-ye Pain